Zahra, and other spellings of the same Arabic word, can refer to:

People
Zahra (name), a feminine given name and a surname
Abdul Zahra, male given name

Towns and districts
Zahra, Ardabil, a village in Iran
Zahret Medien, town in Tunisia
Žehra, village and municipality in the Spišská Nová Ves District in the Košice Region of central-eastern Slovakia

Buildings and institutions
Alzahra University, female-only university in Tehran, Iran
Az-Zahraa Islamic Academy, school in Richmond, British Columbia, Canada
Al-Zahra Mosque, Sydney, Australia
Behesht-e Zahra, cemetery in Tehran, Iran
Ennejma Ezzahra ("Star of Zahra"), a palace at Sidi Bou Said, northern Tunisia

Other
Banu Zuhrah, clan of the Quraish tribe of Arabia
Zahra, film by Mohammad Bakri (2007)
Zahra Foundation Australia, an anti-domestic violence organisation in Adelaide, South Australia
Zahrah, title character of Nnedi Okorafor's children's novel Zahrah the Windseeker
Zahra's Paradise, political webcomic set in modern Iran
Zahra's Blue Eyes, Iranian television series

See also
Al Zahra, neighborhood of Mecca, Saudi Arabia
Az Zahrah, village in San‘a’ Governorate, Yemen
Az Zuhrah District, in Al Hudaydah Governorate, Yemen
Al-Zahra', Palestinian municipality in the Gaza Governorate
Al-Zahraa, village in Aleppo Governorate, Syria
al-Zahra al-Jadeeda, neighborhood in Damascus, Syria
Buin Zahra, city in Iran
Medina Azahara city ruins, (Arabic: Madīnat az-Zahrā) in Córdoba (Spain)
Sahra, track and album by Algerian musician Khaled
Sarah
Zara (disambiguation)
Zahreh, city in Iran
Zohra (disambiguation)